Hans Sverre Sjøvold (born 20 August 1957) is a Norwegian civil servant and former police chief. In 2022, he resigned as chief of Norwegian Police Security Service.

He graduated with the cand.jur. degree in 1988 and embarked on a career in the prosecution authority. From 2001 to 2002 he served as assisting director of the National Police Directorate before serving as Chief of Police in Vestfold from 2002 to 2005. He was then rector of the Norwegian Police University College from 2005 to 2010, and deputy under-secretary of state in the Ministry of Justice and the Police from 2010. He was appointed chief of police of Oslo in 2012, succeeding Anstein Gjengedal.

He has been appointed head of the Norwegian Police Security Service (PST), effective from June 2019.

Controversy
Later in 2019, media revealed - "the weapons' affair" - that Sjøvold had been storing 3 firearms illegally for several years; he had also been doing that at the Department of Justice; in May 2022, MPs sent written questions about the case, to the Minister of Justice; on 25 May 2022, she appeared in front of the Standing Committee on Justice to answer about the controversy.

Sjøvold made a (relevant) written explanation to the Minister of Justice in 2019; as of May 2022 that documentation was not available for public [scrutiny] (but it was released on the day that Sjøvold later resigned); Later in May, the chief of [ Internal affairs (law enforcement) or] Bureau for the Investigation of Police Affairs, said that the agency could have done more investigation when Sjøvold was suspected of having abused his [authority or] position, to get rid of the weapons of a fellow freemason. Later in May, the Standing Committee on Scrutiny and Constitutional Affairs wrote a letter to the Justice Minister, to get answers about the content of Sjøvold's letter to the Justice Minister back in 2019.

As of Q2 2022, a whistleblower appeared regarding the Norwegian Police Service; VG revealed that one police employee became disabled after experiencing threats and coercion from colleagues and leaders regarding [a desire that the] employee should formally accept weapons (on behalf of the police), from Sjøvold.

On 2 June 2022, Sjøvold resigned as chief of Norwegian Police Security Service, which came in the wake of revelations regarding the three firearms that he wanted to get rid of, and which he had stored unlawfully.

References

1957 births
Living people
Norwegian jurists
Norwegian police chiefs
Rectors of universities and colleges in Norway
Directors of government agencies of Norway